Jaungulbene Parish is an administrative unit of Gulbene Municipality, Latvia. The administrative center is Gulbītis.

Towns, villages and settlements of Jaungulbene parish 
 Abrava
 Aduliena
 Agrumi
 Gulbītis
 Jaungulbene
 Kaipi
 Pauri
 Siladzirnavas

References

External links

Parishes of Latvia
Gulbene Municipality